Muskoka Bible Centre (MBC, formerly known as Muskoka Baptist Conference) is Canada's largest Christian conference and retreat centre.

It is affiliated with the Fellowship of Evangelical Baptist Churches and operates Camp Widjiitiwin (a children's camp).

The conference centre is a family-friendly environment, and offers attractions such as tennis, mini-golf, children's programming, and a sandy beach. There is also a campground within the property of the centre.

John Freisan has been the CEO of Muskoka Bible Centre since 2009.

References

External links
Muskoka Bible Centre
Camp Widjiitiwin

Christian organizations based in Canada
Buildings and structures in the District Municipality of Muskoka
Huntsville, Ontario
Convention centres in Canada